The women's team competition of the 2015 World Judo Championships was held on 30 August.

Each team consisted of five judokas from the –48, 57, 63, 70 and +70 kg categories

Results

Repechage

Prize money
The sums listed bring the total prizes awarded to 50,000$ for the individual event.

References

External links
 

Women's team
World Women's Team Judo Championships
World 2015
World Wteam